The Indianapolis metropolitan area is an 11-county metropolitan area in the U.S. state of Indiana, as defined by the Office of Management and Budget. Officially termed the Indianapolis–Carmel–Anderson, IN Metropolitan Statistical Area, the metro area is situated in Central Indiana within the American Midwest and is centered on the capital and most populous city of Indiana, Indianapolis. As of 2020, the population of the metro area was 2,111,040, the 32nd-most populous metropolitan area in the United States and largest in the state of Indiana. Indianapolis also anchors the larger Indianapolis–Carmel–Muncie combined statistical area (CSA), the 26th most populated, with 2,457,286 residents.

The Indianapolis metropolitan area is part of the Great Lakes Megalopolis, which contains an estimated 59 million people.

Metropolitan areas

In the 2020 Census, there were 2,111,040 people residing in the MSA. The racial demographics were 69.6% White, 15.0% Black or African-American, 0.4% American Indian or Alaska Native, 3.9% Asian, 4.5% Other and 6.6% Two or More Races. 8.4% of the population were Hispanic or Latino.

Anchor cities with 100,000 to 1,000,000 inhabitants
 Indianapolis – Pop: 887,642 (2020)
 Fishers – Pop: 101,171 (2021)
 Carmel – Pop: 100,777 (2021)

Municipalities with 50,000 to 100,000 inhabitants

Noblesville – Pop: 70,926	(2021)
Greenwood – Pop: 64,918 (2021)
Anderson – Pop: 55,130
Westfield – Pop: 50,630 (2021)

Municipalities with 10,000 to 50,000 inhabitants

Lawrence – Pop: 47,866
Plainfield – Pop: 35,592 (2021)
Zionsville – Pop: 31,702 (2021)
Brownsburg – Pop: 30,068 (2021)
Franklin – Pop: 25,437 (2021)
Greenfield – Pop: 24,009 (2021)
Avon – Pop: 22,860 (2021)
Shelbyville – Pop: 19,048
Lebanon – Pop: 16,840 (2021)
Beech Grove – Pop: 14,740
Speedway – Pop: 12,102
Martinsville – Pop: 11,669
Whitestown – Pop: 11,093 (2021)
Danville – Pop: 10,758 (2021)
Greencastle – Pop: 10,508
Bargersville – Pop: 10,239 (2021)

Municipalities with 1,000 to 10,000 inhabitants

 Mooresville – Pop: 9,576
 McCordsville – Pop: 9,524 (2021)
 Elwood – Pop: 8,480
 Cumberland – Pop: 6,182 (2021)
 New Whiteland – Pop: 5,593 (2021)
 Alexandria – Pop: 5,067
 Cicero – Pop: 4,891
 Edinburgh – Pop: 4,533
 Whiteland – Pop: 4,303
 Pendleton – Pop: 4,212
 Fortville – Pop: 3,953
 Pittsboro – Pop: 3,188
 Sheridan – Pop: 2,893
 Chesterfield – Pop: 2,504
 Ingalls – Pop: 2,390
 New Palestine – Pop: 2,105
 Cloverdale – Pop: 2,098
 Lapel – Pop: 2,051
 Edgewood – Pop: 1,885
 Frankton – Pop: 1,831
 Southport – Pop: 1,753
 Arcadia – Pop: 1,680
 Meridian Hills – Pop: 1,673
 Brooklyn – Pop: 1,604
 Warren Park – Pop: 1,531
 Thorntown – Pop: 1,484
 Clermont – Pop: 1,402
 Monrovia – Pop: 1,354
 Morristown – Pop: 1,326
 Princes Lakes – Pop: 1,326
 Trafalgar – Pop: 1,145
 Nashville – Pop: 1,076
 St. Paul – Pop: 1,052
 Clayton – Pop: 1,001

Municipalities with fewer than 1,000 inhabitants

 Summitville – Pop: 991
 Morgantown – Pop: 988
 Jamestown – Pop: 939
 Roachdale – Pop: 898
 Shirley – Pop: 828
 Bainbridge – Pop: 742
 Atlanta – Pop: 740
 Homecroft – Pop: 740
 Paragon – Pop: 662
 Rocky Ripple – Pop: 625
 Coatesville – Pop: 542
 Fillmore – Pop: 526
 North Salem – Pop: 525
 Markleville – Pop: 522
 Advance – Pop: 509
 Lizton – Pop: 497
 Wilkinson – Pop: 451
 Williams Creek – Pop: 419
 Amo – Pop: 413
 Orestes – Pop: 411
 Russellville – Pop: 349
 Stilesville – Pop: 326
 Fairland – Pop: 316
 Wynnedale – Pop: 238
 Spring Lake – Pop: 218
 Ulen – Pop: 124
 Spring Hill – Pop: 101
 Bethany – Pop: 81
 Country Club Heights – Pop: 78
 Woodlawn Heights – Pop: 78
 Crows Nest – Pop: 75
 North Crows Nest – Pop: 46
 River Forest – Pop: 22

Counties

Indianapolis–Carmel–Muncie Combined Statistical Area

The Indianapolis–Carmel–Muncie Combined Statistical Area (CSA) in March 2020 consists of 8 Metropolitan Statistical Areas covering 18 counties.
 Indianapolis–Carmel–Anderson Metropolitan Statistical Area (11 counties: Marion, Hamilton, Hendricks, Johnson, Madison, Hancock, Morgan, Boone, Shelby, Putnam, and Brown); population: 2,074,537 (2019 estimate)
 Muncie, IN Metropolitan Statistical Area (Delaware County); population: 114,135 (2019 estimate)
 Columbus, IN Metropolitan Statistical Area (Bartholomew County); population: 83,779 (2019 estimate)
 New Castle, IN Micropolitan Statistical Area (Henry County); population: 47,972 (2019 estimate)
 Seymour, IN Micropolitan Statistical Area (Jackson County); population: 44,231 (2019 estimate)
 Crawfordsville, IN Micropolitan Statistical Area (Montgomery County); population: 38,338 (2019 estimate)
 North Vernon, IN Micropolitan Statistical Area (Jennings County); population: 27,735 (2019 estimate)
 Greensburg, IN Micropolitan Statistical Area (Decatur County); population: 26,559 (2019 estimate)

The cumulative population estimate is 2,457,286, ranked 28th largest in the United States.

Area codes
The 317 area code covered all of northern and central Indiana until 1948, when the 219 area code was created. Central Indiana remained under the 317 banner until 1997, when growth in and around Indianapolis prompted the creation of 765 area code.

The 317 area code covers the Indianapolis metropolitan area. The counties covered by 317 are Boone, Hancock, Hamilton, Hendricks, Johnson, Madison, Morgan, and Shelby.

According to the Indiana Office of Utility Consumer Counselor, the 317 area code was expected to run out of numbers in 2017. Overlay area code 463 was implemented in late 2016, thereby requiring 10-digit dialing.

Transportation

Highways
Indiana's "Crossroads of America" moniker is largely attributed to the historical function of the Indianapolis metropolitan area has played as a center for logistics and transportation.

Interstates
The Indianapolis area is a major point on the United States Interstate Highway System, as it is a confluence of four major interstate highways:
  – Runs to Gary, Indiana to the north and Louisville, Kentucky Nashville, Tennessee, and Birmingham, Alabama, to the south.
  – Runs to Fort Wayne, Indiana, and Lansing and Flint, Michigan to the north and is expected to run to Evansville, Indiana, to the south (currently under construction; Martinsville, Indiana, to Evansville completed)
  – Runs to Dayton and Columbus, Ohio, and Baltimore, Maryland to the east and St. Louis and Kansas City, Missouri, and Denver, Colorado, to the west.
  – Runs to Cincinnati, Ohio, to the east and Peoria, Illinois, to the west.

Other interstates that cross through the Indianapolis area include:
  – Is a beltway circling suburban Indianapolis that is also known as the USS Indianapolis Memorial Highway .
  – Is an east–west connector northwest of Indianapolis in Boone County.

US Highways

Indiana state highways

Other notable roads
Other notable roads in the area are:
 Indiana Avenue (Indianapolis) – One of four diagonal streets included in Alexander Ralston's 1821 Plat of Indianapolis, the street became a center for the local African American community and now anchors a cultural district of the same name.
 Meridian Street (Indianapolis) – A primary north–south route through Marion and Hamilton counties, the street serves as the axis separating east addresses from west addresses.
 Michigan Road – Indiana's first "highway," built in the 1830s and 1840s, running north to Michigan City, Indiana and south to Madison, Indiana.
 Sam Jones Expressway (Indianapolis) – Expressway between I-465 and I-70, connecting south-central Indianapolis with the site of the former terminal of the Indianapolis International Airport.
 Washington Street (Indianapolis) – A primary east–west street through Marion County, the street follows the route of the National Road for almost all of its length in the city of Indianapolis.

Air

The Indianapolis metropolitan area is served by several airports, most under ownership and operation of the Indianapolis Airport Authority, including Eagle Creek Airpark (EYE), Indianapolis Metropolitan Airport (UMP), Indianapolis Regional Airport (MQJ), Hendricks County Airport (2R2), Indianapolis Downtown Heliport (8A4), and the busiest airport in the state, Indianapolis International Airport (IND). In 2014, Indianapolis International served 7.4 million passengers and handled nearly 1 million metric tonnes of cargo.

Other airports within the region include:
 Anderson Municipal Airport
 Elwood Airport
 Franklin Flying Field
 Indianapolis Executive Airport
 Indy South Greenwood Airport
 Noblesville Airport
 Pam's Place Airport
 Pope Field
 Putnam County Airport
 Shelbyville Municipal Airport
 Sheridan Airport
 Westfield Airport

Rail
Indianapolis Union Station is served by Amtrak's Cardinal, which operates thrice-weekly between Chicago and New York City.

Higher education

The Indianapolis metropolitan area is home to a number of higher education institutions, including:
 Anderson University
 Ball State University
 Ball State University College of Architecture and Planning‡
 Butler University
 Christian Theological Seminary
 Crossroads Bible College
 DePauw University
 Franklin College
 Indiana Bible College
 Indiana Institute of Technology‡
 Indiana University – Purdue University Indianapolis
 Herron School of Art and Design
 Kelley School of Business
 O'Neill School of Public and Environmental Affairs
 Robert H. McKinney School of Law
 Indiana University School of Dentistry
 Indiana University School of Education
 Indiana University School of Medicine
 Indiana University School of Liberal Arts
 Indiana Wesleyan University‡
 Ivy Tech Community College of Indiana
 Marian University
 Bishop Simon Bruté College Seminary
 Martin University
 Oakland City University‡
 Trine University‡
 University of Indianapolis
 Vincennes University‡

The ‡ symbol denotes university branches whose main campuses are located outside the Indianapolis metropolitan area.

Sports

Professional teams

Semi-professional teams

College sports (Division I)
Headquartered in Indianapolis, the National Collegiate Athletic Association (NCAA) is the preeminent collegiate athletic governing body in the U.S. and Canada, regulating athletes of 1,281 institutions; conferences; organizations; and individuals. The NCAA also organizes the athletic programs of many colleges and universities and helps more than 450,000 college student-athletes who compete annually in college sports.

Events

The Indianapolis metropolitan area hosts several notable sporting events annually, including the Brickyard 400, Grand Prix of Indianapolis, NHRA U.S. Nationals, NFL Scouting Combine, Big Ten Football Championship Game, the largest half marathon in the U.S., and the largest single-day sporting event in the world, the Indianapolis 500. The cars competing in the latter race are known as IndyCars as a reference to the event. Indianapolis has also been a frequent host of the NCAA Division I Men's and Women's basketball tournaments. Other major sporting events hosted include Pan American Games X in 1987, Super Bowl XLVI in 2012, and the 2013 International Champions Cup between Chelsea F.C. and Inter Milan.

High school sports are highly competitive in Greater Indianapolis. In 2013, MaxPreps ranked Indianapolis No. 3 in its Top 10 Metro Areas for High School Football.

Notable natives

Steve Alford
Philip Warren Anderson
John Andretti
Babyface (musician)
Melvin E. Biddle
Tim Bogar
Roger D. Branigin
James Brewer
Maria Cantwell
Rodney Carney
Ed Carpenter
Lauren Cheney
Roosevelt Colvin
Mike Conley Jr.
James Dean
Chris Doleman
Tandon Doss
Katie Douglas
Colonel Eli Lilly
Steve Ells
Anthony W. England
Mike Epps
Carl Erskine
Michael L. Eskew
Carl G. Fisher
Jared Fogle
Jake Fox
Vivica A. Fox
Brendan Fraser
Katie Gearlds
Jeff George
Eric Gordon
Jeff Gordon
John Green
William Grose
Nick Hardwick
Del Harris
Gordon Hayward
Alan Henderson
George Hill
Tommy Hunter
JaJuan Johnson
Mathias Kiwanuka
Ron Klain
Adam Lambert
Courtney Lee
David Letterman
Richard Lugar
Lance Lynn
George McGinnis
Nick Martin (American football)
Zach Martin
Steve McQueen
Josh McRoberts
Brandon Miller
Rick Mount
Ryan Murphy (writer)
Greg Oden
Jane Pauley
Madelyn Pugh
Oscar Robertson
Courtney Roby
Walter Bedell Smith
Brad Stevens
Tony Stewart
Drew Storen
Marc Summers
Steve Talley
Jeff Teague
Jeremy Trueblood
Kurt Vonnegut
Herman B Wells
Jason Whitlock
David Wolf
John Wooden
Mike Woodson
Lew Wallace

See also

Great Lakes Megalopolis
List of United States combined statistical areas
List of United States metropolitan statistical areas by population

References

External links

Indianapolis, IN Combined Statistical Area (2003) map
U.S. Census Bureau State & County QuickFacts 

 
 
Indiana census statistical areas
Regions of Indiana
Boone County, Indiana
Hamilton County, Indiana
Hancock County, Indiana
Hendricks County, Indiana
Johnson County, Indiana
Madison County, Indiana
Marion County, Indiana
Morgan County, Indiana
Shelby County, Indiana
Articles containing video clips